El Camino Real is a work for concert band by the American composer Alfred Reed.

Program Notes 
The following are the program notes that Alfred Reed wrote to accompany his composition:

References 
Program note by Alfred Reed, from the score to El Camino Real.

Compositions by Alfred Reed
Concert band pieces